Daniel Peter Christopher Maye (born 14 July 1982) is an English former professional footballer who now works as a football coach.

Playing career

Port Vale
Maye started his career with Second Division Port Vale, making his debut as a 67th minute substitute in a 5–0 win over Cambridge United at Vale Park on 5 October 2001, replacing Ian Armstrong. Eleven days later he played the second half of the Football League Trophy clash with Carlisle United, replacing fellow youngster Alex Gibson. Vale scored twice in six minutes to turn the game around 2–1. His final appearance was on 6 April 2002, replacing Marc Bridge-Wilkinson with eight minutes to go of a goalless home draw with Bournemouth.

Southend United
He joined Southend United on a free transfer for the start of the 2002–03 season. He made his debut for the Third Division club on 17 August 2002, replacing Phil Whelan late into a 3–2 defeat to Shrewsbury Town at Roots Hall. His next match was in the League Cup First Round on 10 September, coming on for Damon Searle with the score 3–0 to Wimbledon, the score at full-time was 4–1. He played his last game seven days later, again coming off the bench, this time replacing Neil Jenkins, in another home defeat, Kidderminster Harriers claiming a 2–1 victory. He left the club once his three-month contract expired.

Non-league
Late in 2002 he joined Conference side Nuneaton Borough, before quickly moving on to Corby Town. In 2003, he joined Team Bath, staying for three years, he completed a degree program with the affiliated university – a degree in Coach Education Sports Development from the University of Bath. He spent part of 2006 with Chippenham Town before signing with Taunton Town. In 2007, he joined Yate Town, whilst working as a teacher at a Bath Secondary School before moving on to Bristol Manor Farm.

Coaching career
Maye was appointed as a coach at the Bristol Rovers academy. In December 2012, he joined the coaching staff at Southampton and went on to obtain his UEFA A Licence and by 2019 was working as 'Lead Youth Phase Coach' at the club's academy.

Career statistics

References

1982 births
Living people
Footballers from Leicester
English footballers
Association football midfielders
Port Vale F.C. players
Southend United F.C. players
Nuneaton Borough F.C. players
Corby Town F.C. players
Team Bath F.C. players
Chippenham Town F.C. players
Taunton Town F.C. players
Yate Town F.C. players
Bristol Manor Farm F.C. players
English Football League players
National League (English football) players
Southern Football League players
Western Football League players
Alumni of the University of Bath
Association football coaches
Bristol Rovers F.C. non-playing staff
Southampton F.C. non-playing staff
English football managers